Fred Parker's blindsnake (Gerrhopilus fredparkeri) is a species of snake in the family Gerrhopilidae.

Etymology
The specific name, fredparkeri, is in honor of Australian naturalist Frederick Stanley "Fred" Parker (born 1941).

Geographic range
It is endemic to New Guinea and only known from the Central Province and National Capital District, Papua New Guinea.

References

Further reading
Vidal N, Marin J, Morini M, Donnellan S, Branch WR, Thomas R, Vences M, Wynn A, Cruaud C, Hedges SB (2010). "Blindsnake evolutionary tree reveals long history on Gondwana". Biology Letters 6: 558–561. (Gerrhopilus fredparkeri, new combination).
Wallach V (1996). "Two new blind snakes of the Typhlops ater species group from Papua New Guinea". Russian Journal of Herpetology 3 (2): 107–118. (Typhlops fredparkeri, new species).

Gerrhopilus
Snakes of New Guinea
Reptiles of Papua New Guinea
Endemic fauna of New Guinea
Endemic fauna of Papua New Guinea
Reptiles described in 1996